Radiodiscus hollidayi  is a minute species of air-breathing land snail, a terrestrial gastropod mollusk or micromollusk in the family Charopidae.

Distribution 
This species is currently only known from the island of Trinidad in Trinidad & Tobago.

The type locality is alongside the North Coast Road, San Juan-Laventille region, Trinidad, in leaf litter.

References

External links 
 Image of the holotype specimen held at the Natural History Museum, London

hollidayi
Gastropods described in 2020
Fauna of Trinidad and Tobago